José María Raygada y Gallo (18 December 1795 – 15 January 1859) was a 19th-century Peruvian politician. He was twice Prime Minister of Peru (1857 – 15 July 1858; October 1858 – 15 January 1859). He died in office.

References
 Basadre Grohmann, Jorge (1998) Historia de la República del Perú. 1822 - 1933, 8th edition, Volume 4, Editada por el Diario "La República" de Lima y la Universidad "Ricardo Palma". Impreso en Santiago de Chile, 
 Tauro del Pino, Alberto (2001) Enciclopedia ilustrada del Perú : síntesis del conocimiento integral del Perú, desde sus orígenes hasta la actualidad. 3rd edition. Volume 14. Lima: PEISA. 
 Vargas Ugarte, Rubén: Historia General del Perú. La República (1844-1879). Noveno Tomo. Segunda Edición. Editorial Milla Batres. Lima, Perú, 1984.

1795 births
1859 deaths
Peruvian soldiers
People from Piura